The Lincoln Heritage Trail is a designation for a series of highways in the U.S. states of Illinois, Indiana and Kentucky that links communities with pre-presidential period historical ties to U.S. president Abraham Lincoln.

History 
Fifty years after Lincoln's death (1915), the Illinois General Assembly authorized the Illinois State Historical Library to mark the exact route traveled by Lincoln from Kentucky through Indiana to Illinois. Almost another 50 years passed before the  trail was opened in 1963.  Author Andrew Ferguson cites Robert Newman, Illinois' director of tourism in the 1960s, as saying "the whole thing was cooked up by the marketing guys at the American Petroleum Institute. ... They wanted to get people traveling.  Get 'em into their cars, get 'em buying gasoline." The Trail originally had 3,000 markers showing Lincoln's route to Illinois.

Route description 
As of today, much of the trail is in disrepair and signs are missing or nearly obscured. Yet, some still exist. One sign still stands on US 68 in Perryville, Kentucky. It can be seen when approaching Perryville on US 68 traveling west, as it is at the intersection of US 68, US 150, and KY 52. Another Lincoln Heritage Trail sign is located on US 60 in Frankfort, and can be seen when traveling east just past the interchange with US 421 and KY 676. Another sign is on US 60 Alt. near the Grinstead Drive/I-64 interchange in Louisville. These signs are well over 20 years old. They have not been replaced as Kentucky has moved from the old painted signs to Type III reflective signs. Some counties along the trail have made efforts to restore signs and markers, but overall, the trail is somewhat difficult to follow under modern conditions.

In Illinois, the trail includes IL 155, part of IL 1, IL 33, and IL 97 (New Salem area) and IL 125 (Old Beardstown Post Road).

In Indiana, it includes SR 62 and SR 441.

See also

References

External links 
 Kentucky Lincoln Heritage Trail Kentucky Lincoln Heritage Trail Alliance

Monuments and memorials to Abraham Lincoln in the United States
State highways in Illinois
State highways in Indiana
State highways in Kentucky
U.S. Route 60
U.S. Route 68
Auto trails in the United States